Georges Mukumbilwa (born September 23, 1999) is a professional soccer player who plays as a right-back for Canadian Premier League team Pacific FC. Born in the DR Congo, he represented Canada internationally at youth level.

Early life
Mukumbilwa was born in Kalima, Democratic Republic of Congo, but grew up in a refugee camp in Rwanda. He moved to Winnipeg, Canada with his family, at age 13 where began playing organized soccer with Portage Trail SC. He joined the Manitoba provincial team at U15 level. In 2014, Mukumbilwa joined the Vancouver Whitecaps FC Academy. He eventually joined the Vancouver Whitecaps FC U-23 squad for matches. He was called up to the Whitecaps FC 2 squad for a match on September 2, 2016 in the USL, but did not appear in the match.

Club career
In August 2019, Mukumbilwa signed as a homegrown player with Major League Soccer club Vancouver Whitecaps FC, after having participated in the team's preseason camp earlier in the year. On October 6, 2019, Mukumbilwa made his first MLS appearance, coming on as a substitute in the 80th minute of a 1–0 defeat to Real Salt Lake. He did not appear in any matches in the 2020 season, as visa issues prevented him from travelling to the United States, where the Whitecaps played the majority of their matches, due to the COVID-19 pandemic. He was released by Vancouver on November 30, 2020, with Vancouver's CEO Axel Schuster stating "Georges is a hard working player with good character". "We felt now is the right time for him to find a new team so he can earn regular minutes...". In 2021, he went on trial with Canadian Premier League club Valour FC.

In March 2022, Mukumbilwa signed with Canadian Premier League team Pacific FC, after having trialed with them in preseason. He helped the club qualify for the playoffs in his debut season.

International career
In 2016, he was called up to the Canada U18 team.

References

External links

Living people
1999 births
Black Canadian soccer players
People from Maniema
Canadian soccer players
Canada men's youth international soccer players
Democratic Republic of the Congo footballers
Democratic Republic of the Congo emigrants to Canada
Association football midfielders
Homegrown Players (MLS)
Major League Soccer players
Canadian Premier League players
Vancouver Whitecaps FC players
Pacific FC players
Democratic Republic of the Congo refugees
Refugees in Rwanda
Soccer players from Winnipeg